Sodium hyponitrite is a solid ionic compound with formula  or 2[ON=NO]2−.

There are cis and trans forms of the hyponitrite ion .  The trans form is more common, but the cis form can be obtained too, and it is more reactive than the trans form.

Trans isomer

The trans isomer is colorless and soluble in water and insoluble in ethanol and ether.

Preparation

Sodium hyponitrite (trans) is conventionally prepared by reduction of sodium nitrite with sodium amalgam.
2 NaNO2 + 4 Na(Hg) + 2 H2O → Na2N2O2 + 4 NaOH + 4 Hg

Sodium hyponitrite (trans) was prepared in 1927 by A. W. Scott by reacting alkyl nitrites, hydroxylammonium chloride, and sodium ethoxide
 RONO + NH2OH + 2 EtONa → Na2N2O2 + ROH + 2 EtOH

An earlier method, published by D. Mendenhall in 1974, reacted gaseous nitric oxide with sodium metal in 1,2-dimethoxyethane, toluene, and benzophenone.  The salt was then extracted with water.  The method was later modified to use pyridine.

Other methods included oxidation of a concentrated solution of hydroxylamine with sodium nitrite in an alkaline medium; or electrolysis of sodium nitrite.

Hydrates
A variety of hydratesx of the trans isomer have been reported, with x including 2, 3.5, 4, 5, 6, 7, 8, and 9; but there is some dispute.

The hydration water seems to be just trapped in the crystal lattice rather than coordinated to the ions. The anhydrous substance can be obtained by drying the hydrates over phosphorus pentoxide and then heating them to 120 °C.

Reactions
Sodium hyponitrite (trans) in solution is decomposed by carbon dioxide  from air to form sodium carbonate.

Liquid N2O4 oxidises sodium hyponitrite (trans) to give sodium peroxohyponitrite [ON=NOO]2−).

Cis isomer

The cis isomer of sodium hyponitrite is a white crystalline solid, insoluble in aprotic solvents, and (unlike the trans isomer) decomposed by water and other protic solvents.

Preparation
The  cis isomer of can be prepared by passing nitric oxide through a solution of sodium metal in liquid ammonia at −50 °C.

The cis isomer was also obtained in 1996 by C. Feldmann and M. Jansen by heating sodium oxide  with 77 kPa of nitrous oxide  (laughing gas) in a sealed tube at 360 °C for 2 hours.  The two reagents combined to yield the cis hyponitrite quantitatively as white microcrystals.

Properties and reactions
The anhydrous cis salt is stable up to 325 °C, when it disproportionates to nitrogen and sodium orthonitrite:
 3  → 2 + 2 
It is generally more reactive than the trans isomer.

See also
 Hyponitrous acid

References

Sodium compounds